Fourteenth Century Sky is an extended play (EP) by English big beat duo The Chemical Brothers, their second release under the name The Dust Brothers. The EP contains "Chemical Beats" and "One Too Many Mornings", later released on the Brothers' debut album Exit Planet Dust.
There are two different versions of the EP in terms of design, one has a predominantly black background as in the picture, the other is predominantly white and appears to be somewhat rarer.

"One Too Many Mornings" found fame in 2001 after appearing on several chillout compilation albums. The version of "Chemical Beats" is the full-length version, with an extended intro. The full version of the song wasn't included on Exit Planet Dust due to an uncleared vocal sample and has not been available since. The sample was "take this, brother, may it serve you well," from the Beatles' song "Revolution 9".

Track listings 

1994 debut EPs
The Chemical Brothers EPs